Waldau may refer to:

 Waldau (surname)
 Waldau (Bern), a psychiatric clinic in Bern, Switzerland
 Waldau (Osterfeld), a village in the municipality of Osterfeld, Saxony-Anhalt, Germany
 Waldau (Kassel), a city quarter of Kassel, Hesse, Germany
 Waldau (Titisee-Neustadt), a village in Baden-Württemberg, Germany
 Waldau (Victoria), a suburb of Melbourne, Australia
 Waldau (Vojvodina), the German name for the village of Sonta, Serbia